Ignaţie Budişteanu (born 1888, Bălți - died 20th century) was a Romanian Moldovan farmer from Bessarabia, a member of the Socialist Revolutionary Party.

Biography 
He served as Member of the Moldovan Parliament (1917–1918). He completed the questionnaire of member of Sfatul Țării it at the age of 30. On March 27, 1918, Ignaţie Budişteanu voted for the unification of Bessarabia with Romania.

Gallery

See also
 Sfatul Țării

Bibliography 
Gheorghe E. Cojocaru, Sfatul Țării: itinerar, Civitas, Chişinău, 1998, 
Mihai Taşcă, Sfatul Țării şi actualele autorităţi locale, "Timpul de dimineaţă", no. 114 (849), June 27, 2008 (page 16)

External links 
 Arhiva pentru Sfatul Tarii
 Deputaţii Sfatului Ţării şi Lavrenti Beria

Notes

Moldovan MPs 1917–1918
People from Bălți
1888 births
Year of death missing